Joop Wille (16 September 1920 – 16 January 2009) was a Dutch international footballer who played club football for EDO. Born in Haarlem, Wille died on 16 January 2009, at the age of 88.

References

External links
 Player profile at VoetbalStats.nl
 Player profile at Weltfußball.de

1920 births
2009 deaths
Dutch footballers
Netherlands international footballers
Footballers from Haarlem
HFC EDO players
Association football goalkeepers